The 2015 World Junior Curling Championships was held from February 28 to March 8 at the Tondiraba Ice Rink in Tallinn, Estonia.

Men

Teams
The teams are listed as follows:

Round-robin standings
Final round-robin standings

Round-robin results

Draw 1
Saturday, February 28, 14:00

Draw 2
Sunday, March 1, 9:00

Draw 3
Sunday, March 1, 19:00

Draw 4
Monday, March 2, 14:00

Draw 5
Tuesday, March 3, 9:00

Draw 6
Tuesday, March 3, 19:00

Draw 7
Wednesday, March 4, 14:00

Draw 8
Thursday, March 5, 9:00

Draw 9
Thursday, March 5, 19:00

Playoffs

1 vs. 2
Friday, March 6, 19:00

3 vs. 4
Friday, March 6, 19:00

Semifinal
Saturday, March 7, 19:00

Bronze-medal game
Sunday, March 8, 9:30

Final
Sunday, March 8, 9:30

Women

Teams
The teams are listed as follows:

Round-robin standings
Final round-robin standings

Round-robin results

Draw 1
Saturday, February 28, 18:30

Draw 2
Sunday, March 1, 14:00

Draw 3
Monday, March 2, 9:00

Draw 4
Monday, March 2, 19:00

Draw 5
Tuesday, March 3, 14:00

Draw 6
Wednesday, March 4, 9:00

Draw 7
Wednesday, March 4, 19:00

Draw 8
Thursday, March 5, 14:00

Draw 9
Friday, March 6, 9:00

Tiebreakers
Friday, March 6, 14:00

Playoffs

1 vs. 2
Saturday, March 7, 14:00

3 vs. 4
Saturday, March 7, 14:00

Semifinal
Saturday, March 7, 19:00

Bronze-medal game
Sunday, March 8, 14:00

Final
Sunday, March 8, 14:00

References

External links

Official Website
AllSportDB.com event page

2015 in curling
World Junior Curling Championships
2015 in Estonian sport
Sports competitions in Tallinn
International curling competitions hosted by Estonia
2010s in Tallinn
February 2015 sports events in Europe
March 2015 sports events in Europe
2015 in youth sport